Sophie Audouin-Mamikonian (born August 24, 1961 in Saint-Jean-de-Luz, France) is a French writer and author of young adult fantasy books, including the popular Tara Duncan series.  Like in most of the countries which are not kingdom anymore (Armenia became a regency driven by the Ottoman (Turkey) on the 14th century), she carries the courtesy title HRH Princess Sophie Audouin-Mamikonian.

Biography 
Sophie Audouin-Mamikonian was born in Saint-Jean-de-Luz, France and grew up in the Basque Country where she drew the tales and legends that fuel her imagination. She is married with two daughters, Diane and Marine. She holds a M.A. in diplomacy and strategy. She currently divides her time between family and writing. She is a contributor to Children's Health Fund Children's Health Fund, founded by Paul Simon and Dr. Irwin Redlener and the Princess SAM Foundation for Armenia. She currently lives in Paris.

Sophie's first writing attempts were sketches of fantasy fiction. She wrote the fantasy novel series Tara Duncan between 1987 and 1990, but only found a publisher in 2003, when magic in books became the trend due to the success of Harry Potter.

Sophie has been honored with the Medal of Legion d'Honneur, and the Medal Of Art et Lettres.

Bibliography

Tara Duncan series 
Tara Duncan and the Spellbinders, translated by William Rodarmor (Sky Pony, 2012) 
 Tara Duncan and the Forbidden Book, translated by William Rodarmor (Sky Pony, 2013)
 Tara Duncan and the Cursed Scepter 
 Tara Duncan and the Renegade Dragon
 Tara Duncan and the Forbidden Continent
 Tara Duncan:In Magister’s Trap
 Tara Duncan and the Phantom Invasion
 Tara Duncan and the Evil Empress
 Tara Duncan:Against the Black Queen
 Tara Duncan:Dragons versus Demons
 Tara Duncan:War of the Planets
 Tara Duncan:The Final Battle
 Tara Duncan:Tara and Cal
 Tara Duncan and the OtherWorld Twins
Spinoff Prequel: 450 years ago Beauty's Daughter

The book series has been loosely adapted into a 26-episode animated TV series that is on the Kabillion Cable TV network, produced by Moonscoop, Disney, and M6 and bought by 20 broadcasters. Now the animated series is available on Amazon VOD. Unfortunately it was cancelled before any subsequent seasons could be made to follow the rest of the fourteen books.
Very dissatisfied with this Moonscoop studios' mediocre adaptation, Sophie decided to create her own production company "Princess Sam Entertainment Group". PSEG produced a new animated series, through its subsidiary, Princess Sam Pictures, with a film quality, which is very unusual for an animated series, from the volume one of Tara Duncan: The Spellbinders.
Tara Duncan and the Spellbinders, the brand new CGI 3D animated series, immediately met with the success the first one didn't have, as every episode has been produced as a small movie. The new series has been bought by: the Walt Disney Company France, Belgium, Japan and Russia, Gulli in France, Di Agostini and RAI in Italy, RTBF in Belgium, RTS in Switzerland, MBC in Middle East, Nelonen in Norway, Tele Quebec in Canada, RTE in Ireland, SIC K in Portugal, Noga in Israel, TVNZ in New Zealand, etc.

Indiana Teller series 
The heir of a werewolf pack in Montana, Indiana Teller is the son of a human and a werewolf. But his human genes blocked his wolf genes and he never turned into a wolf. Rejected by the pack, he leaves to go to the University of Montana to study and embrace his human side. There, he meets a very pretty but mysterious human girl, Katerina. For the first time, Indiana feels like a normal person. And falls in love with Katerina.

But why does Louis Brandkel, the chief of another werewolf pack, want Indiana dead? And why does Louis's son Tyler, try so hard to steal Katerina away from him? Amid betrayal and danger, Katerina and Indiana's love face terrible challenges. Because Katerina's beautiful eyes have made Indiana forgot the pack's most important rule: it is forbidden to love a human. And the penalty for breaking that rule is death.
 Spring Moon, translated by William Rodarmor (published as an e-book by Entangled Publishing, 2013)
 Summer Moon (Michel Lafon press)
 Autumn Moon 
 Winter Moon

Young Adult works 
 The Color of Angels'  Souls, Volume 1 (published January 5, 2012) (Robert Laffont, Collection R)
 The Color of Angels' Soul, Volume 2 (to be published, 2014) (Robert Laffont, Collection R)

Fiction 
 La dance des obeses (The Fat Man's Dance)
 Nos destins inachevés (our unfinished destinies) a book about immortality based on real facts (Michel Lafon)

References

External links 
 Author's US (English) Facebook page

1961 births
French people of Armenian descent
People from Saint-Jean-de-Luz
French children's writers
Living people
Basque women writers
French women children's writers